Tage Nathaniel Thompson (born October 30, 1997) is an American professional ice hockey center for the Buffalo Sabres of the National Hockey League (NHL). Thompson was selected 26th overall by the St. Louis Blues in the 2016 NHL Entry Draft.

Early life
Thompson was born in Glendale, Arizona, and lived across the United States, attending 11 different schools before accelerating his graduation from Pioneer High School in Ann Arbor, Michigan, after his junior year, at the University of Connecticut's request.

Playing career
After playing in the U.S. National Development Team in the United States Hockey League, Thompson embarked on a collegiate career with Connecticut in the Hockey East conference. Thompson appeared in all 36 games during his freshman season at UConn in 2015–16 and was second on the team with 32 points on 14 goals and 18 assists. He also led the nation with 14 power play goals.

In the 2016–17 season, and after his selection by the Blues in the draft, Thompson appeared in 34 games with the Huskies as a sophomore. He missed two games while participating with Team USA in the IIHF World Junior U20 Championship in Canada which resulted in Thompson earning his second Gold Medal. During his 34 games, Thompson led the Huskies with 19 goals and 32 points. After the completion of the Huskies season, Thompson opted to conclude his collegiate career and signed a three-year, entry-level contract with the St. Louis Blues on March 7, 2017. He immediately joined the Blues affiliate, the Chicago Wolves of the AHL, on an amateur try-out contract for the remainder of the 2016–17 season.

Thompson made his NHL debut in the Blues' first game of the 2017–18 season, against the Pittsburgh Penguins, on October 4, 2017. He played four NHL games before being sent down to the San Antonio Rampage on October 13, 2017. He was recalled to the NHL on December 18, 2017, and scored his first NHL goal three days later, in a 3–2 loss against the Edmonton Oilers.

On July 1, 2018, he was part of a trade by the Blues that sent Vladimír Sobotka, Patrik Berglund, a 2019 first round draft pick, and a 2021 second round draft pick to the Buffalo Sabres in exchange for Ryan O'Reilly.

On October 5, 2020, as a restricted free agent, Thompson signed a three-year, $4.2 million contract extension with the Sabres.

Entering a season with low expectations for the Sabres, Thompson enjoyed a breakout season playing on the top line with Jeff Skinner and new acquisition Alex Tuch scoring 38 goals and 68 points in 78 games. As a result, he was rewarded a seven-year, $50 million contract extension on August 30, 2022.

On December 7, 2022, against the Columbus Blue Jackets, he scored five goals in a game including four in the first period, becoming the fourth player in NHL history to do so. His five goals also tied the Sabres franchise record for goals in a game, joining Dave Andreychuk. He also became only the second American-born player to score five times in a game; the first one, Mark Pavelich, did it 39 years before Thompson. In January 2023, he was named to the 2023 NHL All Star Game, the first of his career.

Personal life
Thompson's father is former NHL player and current head coach for the Bridgeport Islanders, Brent Thompson. At the time Tage was born, Brent was a member of the Phoenix Coyotes organization. His mother, Kimberly Oliver Thompson, hails from Phoenix, Arizona. His younger brother, Tyce attended Salisbury Prep School, played for the Dubuque Fighting Saints in the USHL and was drafted by the New Jersey Devils. 

Thompson is a Christian. He and his wife have one son.

Career statistics

Regular season and playoffs

International

Awards and honors

References

External links
 

1997 births
Living people
American Christians
American men's ice hockey centers
Buffalo Sabres players
Chicago Wolves players
Ice hockey people from Arizona
Ice hockey players from Connecticut
National Hockey League first-round draft picks
People from Orange, Connecticut
Rochester Americans players
Sportspeople from Phoenix, Arizona
San Antonio Rampage players
St. Louis Blues draft picks
St. Louis Blues players
UConn Huskies men's ice hockey players
USA Hockey National Team Development Program players